Jack D. Walton (May 19, 1926 – December 17, 1952) was an American professional basketball player. He played in the National Basketball League for the Anderson Duffey Packers during the 1948–49 season and averaged 1.8 points per game. He also competed in independent leagues.

In 1949, Walton took a job with a construction company. Three years later, he was accidentally killed on a construction site when a tree being uprooted by a bulldozer fell on him.

References

1926 births
1952 deaths
Accidental deaths in Indiana
United States Army personnel of World War II
American men's basketball players
Anderson Packers players
Basketball players from Indiana
Basketball players from Ohio
Forwards (basketball)
Industrial accident deaths
Military personnel from Ohio
People from Newton Falls, Ohio